Digambara Terapanth is one of the sects of Digambara Jainism, the other being the Bispanthi sect. It formed out of strong opposition to the religious domination of traditional religious leaders called bhattarakas during the 12th-16th century A.D, for the bhattarakas starting deviating from the original/Mula jain customs. They oppose the worship of various minor gods and goddesses. Some Terapanthi practices, like not using flowers in worship, gradually spread throughout most of North Indian Jainism as well.

Origin
The Terapanthi movement was born out of the Adhyatma movement that arose in 1626 AD (V.S. 1683) in Agra. Its leading proponent was Banarasidas of Agra. Adhyatma groups flourished during 1644-1726 in Agra, Lahore and Multan. The poet Dyanatrai was associated with the Adhyatma movement.

The  Bispanth-Terapanth division among the Digambaras emerged in the 17th century in the Jaipur region: Sanganer, Amer and Jaipur itself.

Terapanth was formally founded by Amra Bhaunsa Godika and his son Jodhraj Godika, prominent citizens in Sanganer, during 1664-1667. They expressed opposition to Bhattaraka Narendrakirti of Amber. Authors such as Daulatram Kasliwal and Pandit Todarmal were associated with the Terapanth movement.

Bakhtaram in his "Mithyatva Khandan Natak" (1764) mentions that group that started it included 13 individuals who collectively built a new temple, thus giving it its name Terapanth, which literally means "thirteen-panthan". Alternatively, according to "Kavitta Terapanth kau" by Chanda Kavi, the movement was named Terapanth because it founders disagreed with the Bhattaraka on thirteen points. A letter of 1692 from Terapanthis at Kama to those at Sanganer mentions 13 rituals practices they rejected.

The Terapanthis reject these practices:
Mentioned in Buddhivilas (1770) of Bakhtaram:

 Authority of Bhattarakas
 Use of flowers, cooked food or lamps
 Abhisheka (panchamrita)
 consecration of images without supervision by the representatives of Bhattarakas.

The letter by Tera Panthis at Kama also mentions:
 Puja while seated
 Puja at night
 Using drums in the temple

Terapanth Khandan of Pandit Pannalal also mentions:
 Worship of minor gods like the guardians of the directions, śāsanadevis such as Padmavati, and Kshetrapala.

See also
 Jainism

References

Digambara sects
1626 establishments in India